Gradošorci is a village in the municipality of Vasilevo, North Macedonia.

Demographics
According to the 2002 census, the village had a total of 1,744 inhabitants. Ethnic groups in the village include:

Macedonians 1,041
Turks 683
Romani  5
Others 15

References

Villages in Vasilevo Municipality